Ben Edwards (born 1967), known professionally as Benge is an English musician and record producer based in Cornwall, England. The main focus of his work is within the experimental electronic music field.

Solo career
He launched the record label Expanding Records as an outlet for his debut album Electro-orgoustic Music in 1995. The label, which focuses on instrumental electronic music, continued to grow to include a roster of approximately 20 artists from around the world. He also runs a music studio called Memetune Studios which houses a large collection of vintage electronic synthesisers and other recording equipment.

In 2008, Benge released his tenth studio album Twenty Systems, a concept album which featured twenty tracks made on twenty different synthesisers between the years 1968 and 1988 and an accompanying book describing the instruments and the development of the synthesiser in general. The album was called 'a brilliant contribution to the archaeology of electronic music' by Brian Eno.

Since 2012, Benge has released a regular series of online solo albums via his bandcamp and iTunes pages. These albums regularly feature his "one-synthesiser-per-album" concept, whereby he limits himself to creating a full album using a single electronic music system, thereby developing the idea he introduced with Twenty Systems in 2008.

Benge solo albums

Production career and Memetune Studios
Over the years Benge has amassed a large collection of electronic synthesisers, drum machines and studio equipment which is housed in his 'Memetune Studio Complex'. From here he writes and records his own music as well as his many collaborations

Benge's first work as collaborator and producer was the 1999 synth-pop experiment entitled Volume (with Richard Lee and Paul Elliott). Since then he has regularly worked on collaborative projects, inviting people to co-write, record and mix studio albums and EPs. 

He has also been involved in the production of other artist's records which were recorded at his Memetune studio. Albums by Tunng, Beth Jeans Houghton and Hannah Peel have all been recorded and mixed there with Benge's involvement (alongside Mike Lindsay of Tunng). Benge has also co-produced an album by singer songwriter Serafina Steer, Change is Good.

Benge co-wrote and produced an album with John Foxx (founder of Ultravox!) released in early 2011 under the name John Foxx & The Maths. The album Interplay gained wide critical acclaim. Benge has also performed live with John Foxx and The Maths, including a nine date UK tour, plus festivals in Poland and Belgium. A second album The Shape of Things by John Foxx and the Maths was released prior to the tour in October 2011, and was initially on sale at concerts only. A live performance with John Foxx and the Maths at The Roundhouse in London in June 2010 was captured on the CD/DVD release Analogue Circuit: Live At The Roundhouse (2012). Two further albums Evidence (2012) and Rhapsody (2013) have been released, the latter made up of recorded live at Benge's MemeTune Studios in November 2011. The band won the annual Artrocker Magazine award for Best Electronic Band in 2012.

He has further collaborated with John Foxx and classical violinist Diana Yukawa releasing the album Codex under the collective name of Ghost Harmonic in 2015.

2017 saw the release of five albums (John Foxx & The Maths - The Machine, Fader - First Light, I Speak Machine - Zombies 1985, Lone Taxidermist - Trifle, Blancmange - Unfurnished Rooms) and the recording of three more albums due for release in 2018 (Creep Show ft. John Grant - Mr Dynamite, Oblong - The Sea At Night, Wrangler - A Situation). The Lone Taxidermist LP reached No. 9 in The Quietus top 100 albums of 2017. The Blancmange, Fader, Lone Taxidermist and I Speak Machine albums all made the Electronic Sound magazine best-albums-of-2017 list, reaching No. 8, 13, 21 and 23 respectively. 

As of 2018, Benge has recorded collaborative albums under the following names: Volume (with Richard Lee and Paul Elliott), Tennis (with Douglas Benford), Stendec (with Paul Merritt), Oblong (with Dave Nice and Sid Stronach), Wrangler (with Phil Winter of Tunng, and Stephen Mallinder), Fader (with Neil Arthur), Creep Show (with Wrangler and John Grant), as well as his continuing work with John Foxx as The Maths. His production and writing credits include Serafina Steer, The Magnetic North, Hannah Peel, Laura J Martin, Gazelle Twin, I Speak Machine, Lone Taxidermist and Blancmange. In 2017 Benge began working with John Grant on his fourth solo album. This album entitled Love is Magic was released on 12 October 2018.

Discography of collaborative albums
 Volume | Computer Gun | Expanding Records | 1999
 Volume | Evolver | Expanding Records | 2000
 Tennis | Wooden Sweets | Electro-Chemical Research | 2000
 Tennis | Europe on Horseback | Bip Hop | 2001
 Tennis | Furlines | Bip Hop | 2003
 Stendec | A Study of And | Expanding Records | 2004
 Oblong | Indicator | Expanding Records | 2006
 Serafina Steer | Change is Good | Static Caravan | 2010
 John Foxx & The Maths | Interplay | Metamatic Recordings | 2011
 John Foxx & The Maths | The Shape of Things | Metamatic Recordings | 2011
 John Foxx & The Maths | Evidence | Metamatic Recordings | 2012
 Wrangler | LA Spark | MemeTune | 2014
 Ghost Harmonic | Codex | Metamatic Records | 2015
 Wrangler | White Glue | MemeTune | 2016
 John Foxx & The Maths | The Bunker Tapes | Memetune | 2016
 John Foxx & The Maths | The Machine | Metamatic Recordings | 2017
 Fader | First Light | Blanc Check | 2017
 Lone Taxidermist | Trifle | MemeTune | 2017
 I Speak Machine | Zombies 1985 | Lex Records | 2017
 Blancmange | Unfurnished Rooms | Blanc Check | 2017
 Creep Show | Mr Dynamite | Bella Union | 2018
 John Grant | Love is Magic | Bella Union | 2018

References

External links
 official Expanding Records website
 Play Studios Gallery
 Full Benge Discography
 Benge on Myspace

Living people
1967 births
English electronic musicians
British synth-pop musicians
John Foxx and the Maths members